Selby Field, usually referred to simply as Selby, is the football, field hockey, track & field and lacrosse field at Ohio Wesleyan University in Delaware, Ohio, where the Battling Bishops play.

Selby has a seating capacity of 9,100, with all seats falling between the 15-yard lines of the field. Its press box was lauded as the largest in Ohio outside of Ohio Stadium.

Selby Field is located on South Henry Street, just east of the academic and administrative buildings of Ohio Wesleyan.

On March 18, 1985, Selby Field was added to the National Register of Historic Places.  From 2012 through 2015, the Ohio Machine of Major League Lacrosse played home games at Selby Field.

References

External links

 Selby Field

Sports venues on the National Register of Historic Places in Ohio
National Register of Historic Places in Delaware County, Ohio
Ohio Wesleyan University buildings
American football venues in Ohio
Athletics (track and field) venues in Ohio
Baseball venues in Ohio
College baseball venues in the United States
College football venues
College lacrosse venues in the United States
Sports venues in Ohio
Former Major League Lacrosse venues